Clinocerinae is a subfamily of flies belonging to the family Empididae.

Genera
Afroclinocera Sinclair, 1999
Asymphyloptera Collin, 1933
Bergenstammia Mik, 1881
Clinocera Meigen, 1803
Dolichocephala Macquart, 1823
Hypenella Collin, 1941
Kowarzia Mik, 1881
Oreothalia Melander, 1902
Phaeobalia Mik, 1881
Proagomyia Collin, 1933
Proclinopyga Melander, 1928
Rhyacodromia Saigusa, 1986
Roederiodes Coquillett, 1901
Trichoclinocera Collin, 1941
Wiedemannia Zetterstedt, 1838

References

Empididae
Articles containing video clips
Asilomorpha subfamilies